Gaspard Thémistocle Lestiboudois (12 October 1797, Lille – 22 November 1876, Paris) was a French naturalist. He was the son of botanist François Joseph Lestiboudois (1759-1815) and the grandson of Jean-Baptiste Lestiboudois (1715-1804), a professor of botany at the Faculty of Lille.

In 1818, he obtained his doctorate of medicine in Paris. In 1835 he conducted research of the plague in Algeria. As a passenger on a train, he was involved in a terrible accident at Rœux; despite being injured, he attended to the wounds of other victims.

In August 1868 he was chosen commander of the Legion of Honour.

Written works 
Known for his early investigations of phyllotaxis, in 1848 he published Phyllotaxie anatomique. Other noted works by Lestiboudois include:
 Essai sur la famille des Cypéracées, 1819 - Essay on the family Cyperaceae.
 Études sur l'anatomie et la physiologie des végétaux, Paris : Treuttel et Wurtz, 1840 - Studies on the anatomy and physiology of plants.
 Économie pratique des nations, ou Système économique applicable aux différentes contrées, et spécialement à la France, 1847
 Voyage en Algérie, ou Études sur la colonisation de l'Afrique française, 1853 - Voyage to Algeria; studies on the colonization of French Africa.

References 

French naturalists
1797 births
1876 deaths
French taxonomists
Commandeurs of the Légion d'honneur
Academic staff of the Lille University of Science and Technology
Scientists from Lille
19th-century French botanists